Anthony Small (also known as Abdul Haq) is a retired professional boxer and Islamic political activist who was born 20 June 1981 in Lewisham, London, England. He held both the British and Commonwealth belts at light middleweight. His was also referred to as 'Sugar Ray Clay Jones Jr.' (SRCJJ), in homage to Sugar Ray Robinson, Sugar Ray Leonard, Muhammad Ali, and Roy Jones Jr. Small converted to Sunni Islam at the age of 24. He is active on his YouTube blog where he advocates for Sharia (Islamic political ideology) to be implemented in Britain and is a follower of Anjem Choudary and a member of Al-Muhajiroun/Islam4UK.

Boxing career

Early professional career
Small turned professional aged 23 in 2004 with a first-round knockout of Lance Hall. He was managed by boxing promoter Frank Warren, who had seen Small to wins over former Ukrainian Light Middleweight Champion Vladimir Borovski and previously unbeaten prospect Prince Arron. He also scored a win for the UK team in The Contender Challenge: UK vs. USA on 30 March 2007, defeating Walter Wright in the first matchup of the tournament by a close split decision. However, his World Title hopes were given a massive dent when he was beaten by a technical knockout in round seven by Bradley Pryce whilst fighting for the Commonwealth Light-Middleweight title.

Small's boxing style was considered to be unorthodox. He kept his gloves low, relying on body movement to avoid punches, rather than blocking. Due to his low hand position, he relied mainly on his natural hand speed to surprise his opponents when punching. Additionally, he shifted from the left-foot-forward orthodox stance to the right-foot-forward southpaw stance throughout the bout.

Route to contention
His first fight back following his defeat by Pryce was on 12 January 2008 for the Southern Area Title Light-Middleweight title when he defeated Mehrdud Takaloo by TKO after 7 rounds. On 14 June, he made his first defence, beating George Katsimpas by TKO in the 8th, flooring Katsimpas with a bodyshot. He finished a successful year by also defeating ex-contender star Freddy Curiel with a tenth round stoppage as well as former British title challenger Steve Conway.

British and Commonwealth champion
On 18 July 2009, Small fought for and won both the British and Commonwealth champion with an 8th round stoppage of Manchester's Matthew Hall after overwhelming him with a vicious flurry of hooks in the 8th, which forced the referee to stop the contest. He made his first defence of both titles on 27 November 2009 in a close decision win over Thomas McDonagh over 12 rounds. Small was criticised for his performance with many believing McDonagh had won.  Small chose to give up the Commonwealth title and hold on to the British belt, defending it against mandatory challenger Sam Webb on 26 March 2010, who had also beaten McDonagh on points.  The fight, which was also close, went the distance with Webb surviving a nasty cut in the fifth round to claim the judges decision on points handing a second career defeat to Small.

Protest controversy
Small attracted controversy when he took part in a march in Barking, East London, to protest against the British presence in the war in Afghanistan. Small, a Salafi Muslim, had joined with around 50 other demonstrators who called themselves 'Muslims Against Crusades', which is a new front for al-Muhajiroun/Islam4UK, at the march on 15 June 2010.

In 2014, he was arrested after two other men were apprehended at Dover with false documents, and appeared in court at the Old Bailey on 15 June 2015 charged with planning to go to Syria to fight with Islamic State after spreading terrorist material online. He was found not guilty. In January 2018 Small was formally charged with "encouraging acts of terrorism" in a 2016 social media post following an investigation by the Metropolitan Police. He was acquitted in June.

Other media appearances
In 2016, he appeared on the BBC Two documentary Muslims Like Us, in which ten Muslims of diverse beliefs were placed in a house together. His appearance was controversial for being potentially unrepresentative of the views of most Muslims in the UK, although reviewers noted that he was challenged vehemently on his views by the other housemates.

Professional boxing record

References

1981 births
Living people
British Muwahhid Muslims
Boxers from Greater London
English Muslims
Converts to Islam
Black British sportsmen
English male boxers
English Islamists
British Salafis
Light-middleweight boxers